Freestyle skiing was a demonstration sport at the 1988 Winter Olympics. The venues were Canada Olympic Park for aerials and ballet, and Nakiska for moguls. This was the first appearance of freestyle skiing at the Winter Olympics.

Medal table

Men's event

Moguls

Aerials

Ballet

Women's event

Moguls

Aerials

Ballet

References
Olympic Review – March 1988

 
1988 Winter Olympics
1988 Winter Olympics events
Olympics
Men's events at the 1988 Winter Olympics
Women's events at the 1988 Winter Olympics